Vroville is a commune in the Vosges department in Grand Est in northeastern France.

Population

Geography
The river Madon flows through the commune.

See also
Communes of the Vosges department

References

Communes of Vosges (department)